The  Basilica of our Lady of Perpetual Help is a Roman Catholic minor basilica and former cathedral dedicated to the Blessed Virgin Mary located in Labrador City, Newfoundland and Labrador, Canada.  The basilica is under the circumscription of the Diocese of Corner Brook and Labrador.  The church was completed in 1962, and served as the cathedral of the former Diocese of Labrador City–Schefferville.  The basilica was decreed on June 1, 2007.

History
Fr. Jacques Laperriere, OMI, visiting from Schefferville, Quebec, said the first mass at Christmas 1959. It was held in a mine garage. The bishop appointed Fr. Theodore Roussel, OMI, as the first pastor in 1960. He led the drive to build the first church. The church was opened in 1962.

In response to Bishop Peter Sutton, OMI, request, Pope Paul VI decreed in 1976 that the church become a co-cathedral with the one at Schefferville. When mining stopped in Schefferville, the Episcopal see was transferred to Labrador City in 1980, raising the status of Our Lady of Perpetual Help to a cathedral.

In 2007, Pope Benedict XVI  decreed that the cathedral was a  basilica. It was the second basilica in the province and the twenty-first in Canada.

Building

The basilica is a two-storey postmodern structure with a rock façade and a steeple located next to the front entrance. The tower houses three bells.

Pastors
Rev. Theodore Roussel, OMI, 1960 - ?
Rev. Jaroslaw Pachocki, OMI, ?-2012
Rev Joy Paul Kallikatukudy, OMI, -current

Footnotes

External links
Basilica Website

Basilica churches in Canada
Labrador City
Roman Catholic Diocese of Corner Brook and Labrador
Roman Catholic churches completed in 1962
Roman Catholic churches in Newfoundland and Labrador
Roman Catholic cathedrals in Canada
20th-century Roman Catholic church buildings in Canada